The following is a comprehensive discography of John Mellencamp, an American singer-songwriter. During Mellencamp's more than four decades in the recording industry, he has released 23 studio albums, two live albums, four compilation albums, 69 singles and has appeared on one tribute album and one guest single respectively.

His 1976 debut album Chestnut Street Incident (credited to the stage name Johnny Cougar) failed to make any significant impact and was therefore considered a major disappointment for his then-record label Mainman. Consequently, Johnny Cougar (the artist) was dropped by Mainman. Mellencamp was eventually re-signed, this time to Riva Records, and would continue to record under the John Cougar moniker for several more years. Mellencamp's first album to chart on the Billboard 200 was the self-titled John Cougar album in 1979, which was certified Gold by the RIAA. Mellencamp's major commercial breakthrough came in 1982 with American Fool, which reached number one on the Billboard 200 and yielded two singles, "Hurts So Good" and "Jack & Diane", which reached number two and number one respectively on the Billboard Hot 100. American Fool would eventually sell ten million copies worldwide (5 million in the US alone). From 1983 to 1987, Mellencamp released three consecutive albums—Uh-Huh (1983), Scarecrow (1985), and The Lonesome Jubilee (1987)—which were all certified Triple Platinum by the RIAA. Combined, the three albums spawned sixteen singles, seven of which—"Crumblin' Down", "Pink Houses", "Lonely Ol' Night", "Small Town", "R.O.C.K. in the U.S.A.", "Paper in Fire" and "Cherry Bomb"—became top ten hits in the US. In 1997, Mellencamp released his first ever greatest hits collection entitled The Best That I Could Do 1978–1988. To date, this compilation has sold six million copies worldwide.

Mellencamp has charted twenty eight singles on the Billboard Hot 100, including twenty two hits in the Top 40, seventeen of which made the Top 20 and ten of those would crack the top 10. He has scored twenty two albums on the Billboard 200, including seventeen in the Top 20 and eleven in the Top 10. Mellencamp has sold about thirty million albums in the US and over sixty million worldwide.

Studio albums

1970s

1980s

1990s

2000s

2010s

2020s

Compilation albums

Live albums

Singles

1970s singles

1980s singles

1990s singles

2000s singles

2010s and 2020s singles

Featured singles

Other appearances

Music videos

See also
 Falling from Grace
 Ghost Brothers of Darkland County

Notes

 A^ The Lonesome Jubilee also reached number 63 on the Billboard Top Country Albums chart.
 B^ "Peaceful World" did not enter the Billboard Hot 100, but peaked at number 4 on the Bubbling Under Hot 100; an extension of the Hot 100 chart.
 C^ "What Say You" did not enter the Billboard Hot 100, but peaked at number 17 on the Bubbling Under Hot 100; an extension of the Hot 100 chart.

References

Discographies of American artists
Discography
Rock music discographies